Bratanov is a Bulgarian male surname, its feminine counterpart is Bratanova. Notable people with the surname include:

Kiril Bratanov (1911–1986), Bulgarian biologist
Velko Bratanov (born 1949), Bulgarian modern pentathlete
Yanko Bratanov (born 1952), Bulgarian sprinter